Robyn Gabel (born February 7, 1953) is the Majority Leader of the Illinois House of Representatives. A Democrat, she has represented the 18th District since April 19, 2010. The district includes the suburbs of Evanston, Wilmette, Kenilworth, Northbrook, Northfield, Winnetka and Glencoe.

Early life and career
Gabel has a Bachelor of Arts from Beloit College, a Master of Science in Public Health from University of Illinois Chicago's School of Public Health, and a Master of Jurisprudence in Health Law from Loyola University of Chicago. From 1988 to 2010 she was the executive director of the Illinois Maternal and Child Health Coalition. On March 16, 2009, she was appointed to the Commission on the Elimination of Poverty. The Commission was established to address poverty in Illinois consistent with international human rights standards.

Illinois House of Representatives
Gabel was appointed to the Illinois House of Representatives in April 2010 after Representative Julie Hamos became Director of the Department of Healthcare and Family Services. In 2018, Gov. J.B. Pritzker appointed Gabel to Powering Illinois’ Future transition committee, which is responsible for infrastructure and clean energy policies.

As of July 3, 2022, Representative Gabel is a member of the following Illinois House committees:

 Appropriations - Human Services Committee (HAPH)
 Energy & Environment Committee (HENG)
 Financial Impact Subcommittee (HMAC-IMPA)
 Human Services Committee (HHSV)
 Insurance Committee (HINS)
 (Chairwoman of) Medicaid Subcommittee (HHSV-MEDI)
 Museums, Arts, & Cultural Enhancements Committee (HMAC)
 State Government Administration Committee (HSGA)
 (Chairwoman of) Wages & Rates Subcommittee (HAPH-WAGE)
On January 13, 2023, House Speaker Chris Welch named Gable the House Majority Leader. She succeeds Greg Harris in the position.

Electoral history

References

External links
Representative Robyn Gabel (D) 18th District at the Illinois General Assembly
By session:  98th,  97th, 96th

Robyn Gabel at Illinois House Democrats

1953 births
21st-century American Jews
21st-century American politicians
21st-century American women politicians
Beloit College alumni
Democratic Party members of the Illinois House of Representatives
Living people
Loyola University Chicago School of Law alumni
Jewish American state legislators in Illinois
People from Evanston, Illinois
University of Illinois Chicago alumni
Women state legislators in Illinois